Madarasz's tiger parrot (Psittacella madaraszi) is a species of parrot in the family Psittaculidae native to New Guinea.
Its natural habitat is subtropical or tropical moist montane forests.

Its common name and Latin binomial commemorate the Hungarian ornithologist Gyula von Madarász.

Description 
Madarasz's tiger parrot is a relatively small parrot, with a height of about 14 cm and an average weight of around 34–44 grams. Males and females feature an olive/brown head. From crown to hindneck, it has yellow feathers, giving it speckled appearance. The throat area has a more dull yellow hue. The upper breast is olive in color. It has green tail feathers with red undertail coverts. The beak is a light blue/grey tipped with white. Females have a blue wash on the forehead and an orange wash on the nape and hindneck.

References

Madarasz's tiger parrot
Birds of New Guinea
Endemic fauna of New Guinea
Least concern biota of Oceania
Madarasz's tiger parrot
Taxonomy articles created by Polbot